A punk zine (or punkzine) is a zine related to the punk subculture and hardcore punk music genre. Often primitively or casually produced, they feature punk literature, such as social commentary, punk poetry, news, gossip, music reviews and articles about punk rock bands or regional punk scenes.

History

1970s: origins

Starting in the 1970s, the DIY aesthetic of the punk subculture created a thriving underground press. Amateur magazines related to punk were inspired by the rock fanzines of the early 1970s, which were inspired by zines from the science fiction fan community. Perhaps the most influential of the fanzines to cross over from science fiction fandom to rock and, later, punk rock and new wave music was Greg Shaw's Who Put the Bomp, founded in 1970.

One of the earliest punk zines was Punk, founded in New York City by John Holmstrom, Ged Dunn and Legs McNeil. Debuting in January 1976, the zine championed the early New York underground music scene and helped associate the word "punk" with these bands, most notably the Ramones. Other early punkzines from the United States included Search & Destroy (later REsearch), Flipside and Slash.

An early United Kingdom punk zine was Sniffin' Glue, produced by Mark Perry, who also founded the band Alternative TV, in 1976. Perry produced the first photocopied issue of Sniffin' Glue in London after attending the Ramones concert on 4 July 1976 at the Roundhouse. Punk zines were produced in many European countries in subsequent years. The first Irish one was published in March 1977.

In Australia in 1977, inspired by the Saints and Radio Birdman, Bruce Milne and Clinton Walker fused their respective first zines Plastered Press and Suicide Alley to launch Pulp; Milne later went on to invent the cassette zine with Fast Forward, in 1980. Another early publication was Self Abuse first published in Sydney in December 1977.

1980s
 
The politically charged Maximum RocknRoll and the anarchist Profane Existence were notable punkzines that were founded in the 1980s. By that time, most local punk scenes had at least one punkzine.  The magazine Factsheet Five chronicled thousands of underground publications and "zines" in the 1980s and 1990s.

In the 1980s, the punk self-publication scene was quickly expanding to include numerous different subcultures within the genre. For example, the birth of the Queercore movement: inspired by the desire for social change, the subculture was represented by zines that sought to accept those within the LGBT community who were also involved in punk and also had overwhelming themes of promoting individual rights. The topics discussed in the issues often ignited forums and chatrooms where readers could share their opinions. This genre of zine was self-sustaining and produced in a DIY manner. Queercore is often accredited to a Toronto-based zine entitled J.D.s, an abbreviation for "juvenile delinquents", created by H. Quinn and co-published with Bruce Wayne. H.Q.s was a cut-and-paste-style zine that featured manifestos and dialogue about identifying as queer within the realms of the punk community. Other zines that instigated this movement are Chainsaw (punk zine), Outpunk, and Homocore. The queercore zines influenced the Riot Grrrl zines of the late 1980s and 1990s, as well.

Riot Grrrl zines
The "Riot Grrrl" movement emerged from the punk scene in the United States when women began to produce zines with feminist themes. The "riot grrrl" wave was influential for pinkzines as it called for women to publish and produce content in the male dominated culture. Featuring political issues from a personal standpoint, the zines arose in popularity amongst the underground world of punk. The format of the "riot grrrl" zines was similar to that of queercore zines, in that they were cut and paste and xeroxed with many featuring collages. Self-published punkzines from this era such as Bikini Kill, Girl Germs, Le Tigre, and Jigsaw were put out by members of riot grrrl bands who supported the notion of women learning to play music and feeling self-empowered. Other apparent themes in this category of zine include activism, social change, sexuality, body image, and the discussion of controversial topics such as racism and abuse.

List of punk zines

 Absolutely Zippo
 Artcore
 Black Market Magazine
 Chainsaw
 Cometbus
 Flipside
 Gadgie
 Girl Germs
 HeartattaCk
 Homocore
 Jamming
 J.D.s
 Kill Your Pet Puppy
 Lights Go Out
 Lobotomy
 Love & Molotov Cocktails
 Maximum RocknRoll
 New York Rocker
 No Cure
 Outpunk
 Ox-Fanzine
 Pork
 Profane Existence
 Punk Magazine
 Rancid News
 Rave On
 Razorcake
 RE/Search
 Slash
 Slug and Lettuce
 Sluggo!
 Sniffin' Glue
 Spuno
 Substitute
 Suburban Voice
 Suburban Rebels
 Take It
 TNSrecords Fanzine
 Touch and Go
 T.V.O.R.

References